Cylinder blown sheet is a type of hand-blown window glass. It is created with a similar process to broad sheet, but with the use of larger cylinders. In this manufacturing process glass is blown into a cylindrical iron mold. The ends are cut off and a cut is made down the side of the cylinder. The cut cylinder is then placed in an oven where the cylinder unrolls into a flat glass sheet. William J. Blenko used this method in the early 1900s to make stained glass. The result is much larger panes and improved surface quality over broad sheet, although still containing some imperfections. These imperfect panes have led to the misconception that glass is actually a high-viscosity fluid at room temperature, which is not the case.

This method caused surface damages on the glass due to the flattening and moving, and the sheet therefore had to be ground and polished. In 1839 the Chance Brothers invented the patent plate process where the glass plate was placed on a wet piece of leather and ground and polished to remove all the surface damage.

Other methods of producing hand-blown window glass included broad sheet, blown plate, crown glass and polished plate. These methods of manufacture lasted at least until the end of the 19th century. The early 20th century marks the move away from hand-blown to machine manufactured glass such as rolled plate, machine drawn cylinder sheet, the Fourcault process of flat drawn sheet, single and twin ground polished plate and most common, float glass.

Cylinder blown sheet glass was manufactured in the UK in the mid 19th century. It had been manufactured in France and Germany (and imported to the UK) since the 18th century.

References

Glass production